Max Emilian Verstappen (born 30 September 1997) is a Dutch racing driver and the 2021 and 2022 Formula One World Champion. He competes under the Dutch flag in Formula One with Red Bull Racing.

Verstappen is the son of racing drivers Jos Verstappen, who also competed in Formula One, and Sophie Kumpen. He had a successful run in junior karting and single-seater categories – including KF3, WSK World Series, KZ2 and European Formula 3 – beating several records.

At the 2015 Australian Grand Prix, when he was aged , he became the youngest driver to compete in Formula One. After spending the  season with Scuderia Toro Rosso, Verstappen started his  campaign with the Italian team before being promoted to parent team Red Bull Racing after four races as a replacement for Daniil Kvyat. At the age of 18, he won the 2016 Spanish Grand Prix on his debut for Red Bull Racing, becoming the youngest-ever driver and the first Dutch driver to win a Formula One Grand Prix. After winning the 2021 Abu Dhabi Grand Prix, Verstappen became the first Dutch driver to win the Formula One World Championship, and the 34th Formula One World Drivers' Champion. He won his second consecutive Formula One championship the next season.

He scored the first hat-trick of his career at the 2021 French Grand Prix and his first grand slam at the 2021 Austrian Grand Prix. He scored his second grand slam at the 2022 Emilia Romagna Grand Prix. Verstappen is set to remain at Red Bull until at least the end of the 2028 season after signing a contract extension.

Personal life
Max Emilian Verstappen was born on 30 September 1997 in Hasselt, Belgium to Jos Verstappen and Sophie Kumpen, and has a younger sister, Victoria. Verstappen's parents separated when he was young, after which he lived with his father while his sister Victoria lived with their mother. Verstappen has three younger half-siblings from his father; a sister, Blue Jaye, from his second marriage and a brother and sister, Jason Jaxx and Mila Faye, from his current marriage.

His family has a long association with motor sports: his father is a Dutch former Formula One driver, his Belgian mother competed in karting, and his first cousin once removed, Anthony Kumpen, competed in endurance racing and is a two-time NASCAR Whelen Euro Series champion currently serving as the team manager for PK Carsport in Euro Series. Although Verstappen has a Belgian mother, was born in Belgium and resided in Bree, Belgium, he decided to compete with a Dutch racing licence because he "feels more Dutch", having spent more time with his father than with his mother owing to his karting activities, and was always surrounded by Dutch people while growing up in Maaseik, a Belgian town at the Dutch border. Verstappen said in 2015: "I actually only lived in Belgium to sleep, but during the day I went to the Netherlands and had my friends there too. I was raised as a Dutch person and that's how I feel."

He competed in Formula One for more than a season before obtaining a road driving licence on his 18th birthday. Verstappen moved to Monaco the day after, in October 2015, and has lived there since and has said it was not for tax reasons. In November 2020, Verstappen bought a Dassault Falcon 900EX aircraft from Virgin Galactic. The aircraft is registered PH-DTF and operated by Exxaero.

In his free time, Verstappen enjoys sim racing. Having taken part in many sim racing competitions, Verstappen stated that it helps him with his real life racing keeping him ″ready to go″. Verstappen is a member of Team Redline; a multinational sim racing team. Verstappen is a supporter of FC Barcelona and PSV Eindhoven. Verstappen speaks three languages, Dutch, English and German, the latter of which he learned while karting with Michael Schumacher. In September 2022, he was made an Officer of the Order of Orange-Nassau in recognition of his racing achievements. Verstappen has been publicly dating Kelly Piquet since January 2021.

Junior career
Verstappen competed in the Mini Junior championship of his home province of Limburg, Belgium. In 2006, Verstappen graduated to the Rotax Max Minimax class and won the Belgian championship. In 2007, Verstappen won the Dutch Minimax championship. Racing in a CRG kart entered by his father, Verstappen won the Dutch and Belgian Minimax championships as well as the Belgian Cadet championship. In 2009, Verstappen joined Team Pex Racing, a CRG customer team. That year, he won the Flemish Minimax championship and the Belgian KF5 championship.

Verstappen stepped up to international karting in 2010. He was signed by CRG to race in their factory team at the World and European championships. At the KF3 World Cup, Verstappen finished second to the more experienced Alexander Albon (who would eventually become his Formula One teammate at Red Bull Racing) but beat him at the WSK Euro Series and also won the WSK World Series, beating Robert Vișoiu. In 2011, Verstappen won the WSK Euro Series in a Parilla-powered CRG. In the following year, Verstappen entered the Intrepid Driver Program to race in the KF2 and KZ2 classes. He won the WSK Master Series in the KF2 class, beating CRG driver Felice Tiene. Verstappen won the South Garda Winter Cup in the KF2 class, beating Dennis Olsen and Antonio Fuoco.

At the end of 2012, it was announced that Verstappen would leave Intrepid. After a short stint with CRG-built Zanardi karts, Verstappen returned to the factory CRG team. He competed at the SKUSA SuperNationals in the KZ2 class in a CRG, finishing 21st. Aged 15, Verstappen won two European titles and a world title in 2013 (the European and World KF and KZ championships); an unprecedented feat in the history of the discipline. Verstappen won the 2013 World KZ championship at Varennes-sur-Allier, France; becoming the youngest driver ever to win the KZ world championship.

Florida Winter Series and Formula Three 

Verstappen's first experience in a racing car was at the Pembrey Circuit on 11 October 2013. He drove 160 laps in a Barazi-Epsilon FR2.0–10 Formula Renault car. The car was provided by Dutch team MP Motorsport. He tested for several Formula Renault 2.0 teams in 2013. In December 2013, Verstappen tested a Dallara F311 Formula 3 car run by Motopark Academy. An additional Formula Renault test followed in December at Circuito de Jerez. Driving for Josef Kaufmann Racing, Verstappen went faster than Formula Renault regulars like Steijn Schothorst and Matt Parry. At the Circuit Ricardo Tormo near Valencia, Verstappen set a faster lap time than the more experienced driver Eddie Cheever III.

On 16 January 2014, it was announced Verstappen would make his racing debut in the non-championship Florida Winter Series. On 5 February, at the second race weekend, Verstappen won the race at Palm Beach International Raceway after he started from pole. A few weeks later, Verstappen won his second race of the series at Homestead–Miami Speedway after beating Nicholas Latifi by 0.004 seconds. Following his single-seater debut in the inaugural Florida Winter Series, Verstappen drove in the FIA European Formula 3 Championship for Van Amersfoort Racing. Aged 16, Verstappen scored a record six consecutive victories in the series, and a record ten victories in total, along with eight retirements and one DNS (did not start); placing third in the overall rankings.

Formula One career

Scuderia Toro Rosso (2014–2016)
During the first practice session at the 2014 Japanese Grand Prix, Verstappen replaced Jean-Éric Vergne as part of his preparation for a full-time seat at Toro Rosso in the  season. Aged 17 years and three days, Verstappen was the youngest person in history to participate in a Formula One race weekend. In August 2014, Verstappen joined the Red Bull Junior Team after testing a Formula Renault 3.5 car. He also considered an offer from Mercedes to join their driver development programme.

Verstappen became the youngest driver to start a World Championship race through joining Toro Rosso's race drivers’ line-up with Carlos Sainz as his teammate, in his Grand Prix debut as a full-time driver at the 2015 Australian Grand Prix at the age of breaking Jaime Alguersuari's existing record by almost two years. In this first race, Verstappen ran in points-scoring positions until he was forced to retire due to an engine failure. However, at the subsequent race in Malaysia, Verstappen qualified sixth and finished the race in seventh place, scoring his first Formula One points aged , breaking the record of the then-youngest driver to score World Championship points.

At the 2015 Monaco Grand Prix, Verstappen was involved in a high-speed collision with Romain Grosjean, after clipping the back of Grosjean's Lotus on the approach to the tight first corner, Sainte Devote, and crashed into the barriers at high speed. Verstappen was given a five-place grid penalty for causing the accident, and was branded "dangerous" by Williams driver Felipe Massa.

Verstappen continued to regularly finish in the points as well as achieving his best finish of the 2015 season in Hungary by finishing fourth, and equalled this result at the United States Grand Prix. At the end of the season, Verstappen received three awards at the FIA Prize Giving Ceremony, for "Rookie of the Year", "Personality of the Year" and "Action of the Year", for his overtake on Felipe Nasr on the outside of the Blanchimont corner at the Belgian Grand Prix.

Verstappen began the 2016 season at Toro Rosso, again alongside Sainz. Verstappen qualified fifth for the opening race of the season in Australia, but during the race made several radio calls to his team due to frustration at being behind Sainz on track before Verstappen's Toro Rosso came into contact with his teammate's car whilst attempting to pass him with three laps to go, and he eventually finished tenth. Verstappen enjoyed a more successful weekend at the following race in Bahrain, finishing sixth to score Toro Rosso's first-ever points at the Sakhir circuit.

Red Bull (2016–present)

2016 season

According to Red Bull Team Principal Christian Horner, "Max has proven to be an outstanding young talent. His performance at Toro Rosso has been impressive so far and we are pleased to give him the opportunity to drive for Red Bull Racing." After qualifying fourth for the Spanish Grand Prix, Verstappen rose to second behind teammate Daniel Ricciardo on the opening lap after Mercedes teammates Lewis Hamilton and Nico Rosberg crashed out of the race. Verstappen took the race lead as he was placed on a two-stop rather than the same three-stop strategy as Ricciardo, and he held off Ferrari's Kimi Räikkönen in the later stages of the race to take his first Formula One victory. By doing so he displaced Sebastian Vettel as the youngest driver ever to win a Formula One Grand Prix at the age of 18 years and 228 days.

In his first eight races with Red Bull, he achieved six top-five finishes, including four podiums.

During the Belgian Grand Prix, Verstappen collided with Räikkönen at the first corner, pushed Vettel, Räikkönen and Pérez wide at Les Combes, and aggressively blocked Räikkönen on the Kemmel straight. Verstappen was criticised for his driving, with Räikkönen saying that he "was going to cause a huge accident sooner or later." Christian Horner noted that the driving was "on the edge", and that Verstappen will "look at it and learn for future races." In September, Formula One director Charlie Whiting called in Verstappen for a discussion, and later gave him a 'gentle warning' due to his aggressive driving. However, in October, drivers' concerns about Verstappen's defensive tactics led the FIA to disallow moving under braking.

At the 2016 Brazilian Grand Prix, Verstappen qualified fourth. In a rain affected race, he almost hit the barrier after he slid on the main straight due to a loss of traction, causing oversteer. After an additional tyre change from intermediates back to rain tyres, he ran in 16th place with just 15 laps remaining. Verstappen then made several overtakes in quick succession during the closing laps to eventually finish on the podium in third place. He received considerable praise for his performance: rival team Mercedes' team principal, Toto Wolff, labelled it "The Verstappen Show", and described Verstappen's drive as "physics..being redefined". However, Verstappen came under criticism from four-time world champion Sebastian Vettel, who stated that Verstappen had pushed him off the track at the Junção corner late in the race. The race stewards did not share Vettel's view and decided that no reprimand was warranted.

2017 season

During the first 14 races of the 2017 season, Verstappen suffered seven retirements, four due to mechanical issues, and three due to first lap collisions in Spain, Austria and Singapore. Of the races he finished, however, he claimed a third place in China, and in the another five races he finished fourth or fifth.

From the Malaysian Grand Prix onward, Verstappen enjoyed a surge of success. He won his second Formula One race at the 2017 Malaysian Grand Prix, a day after his 20th birthday, passing then three-time champion Lewis Hamilton for the lead in the early stages of the race. He finished second in the following race in Japan. He then finished third at the United States Grand Prix, but was classified fourth after his final lap overtake on Kimi Räikkönen was deemed illegal. He won his third Formula One race at the Mexican Grand Prix, after passing Sebastian Vettel on the opening lap.

2018 season

In the first six races of the season, Verstappen had been involved in at least one incident in each race. In Australia, he qualified fourth but fell behind Kevin Magnussen at the start. In his attempts to retake the position he ran wide multiple times and damaged his car, with a spin causing him to fall further down the order. He recovered to eventually finish the race in sixth place. At the next race in Bahrain, he crashed during qualifying and started in 15th place. He had a productive first lap after which he found himself in the points while challenging Lewis Hamilton. He attempted an overtake on the reigning World Champion at the start of lap two, but collided with the Mercedes driver and suffered a puncture that ultimately led to suspension damage, forcing him out of the race.

At the next race in China, Verstappen qualified fifth and had moved up to third at the end of the first lap. Both Red Bull drivers pitted for fresh tyres during a safety car which left them with a tyre advantage over the front-runners ahead. In an overtake attempt on Sebastian Vettel for third place, Verstappen collided with the championship leader, causing him to fall to eighth and receive a 10-second penalty. He recovered to fourth place, with his penalty causing him to be classified fifth. Teammate Ricciardo went on to win the race. In Azerbaijan, Verstappen was embroiled in a race-long battle with Ricciardo for fourth place. After numerous position changes between the two teammates during the race, Ricciardo ran into the back of Verstappen during an overtake attempt from which the Dutchman aggressively defended, causing the retirement of both cars. Both drivers were blamed by the team and reprimanded by the stewards. Verstappen bounced back in Spain with his first podium of the season by finishing third behind the Mercedes drivers, holding off Sebastian Vettel. However, the race was also not without incident as he had run into the back of Lance Stroll during the virtual safety car period, causing minor front wing damage.

In Monaco, Verstappen made another error and crashed near the end of the third free practice session in an incident which closely resembled a crash he had at the same spot two years earlier. His team could not repair his car in time for qualifying and Verstappen had to start the race from the back of the grid. Verstappen did not compete and did not set a lap time in qualifying, therefore teammate Ricciardo pressed home Red Bull's advantage at the track by taking pole position and the race win. Verstappen managed to salvage 2 points by finishing ninth place, overtaking 6 cars on track. Team principal Christian Horner commented on Verstappen's start of the season, saying he "needed to stop making these mistakes" and that he could "learn from his teammate", while Helmut Marko, head of driver development at Red Bull, said that Verstappen was "too impatient". Verstappen now lay in sixth place in the championship with 35 points, only three points ahead of Fernando Alonso in the McLaren, and 37 points behind his teammate in third, who had taken two wins in the first six races.

In Canada, Verstappen topped all three practice sessions and qualified third, two-tenths off Sebastian Vettel in pole position. He eventually finished third and set the fastest lap of the race. The following race in France brought him second place. In Austria—Red Bull's home track, he started fourth on the grid, passed Kimi Räikkönen before taking advantage of retirement from Valtteri Bottas and a botched pit-stop strategy by Lewis Hamilton, who later had to retire from fourth place, to claim the fourth race victory of his career. In Britain, Verstappen was plagued by issues, finishing the first practice session early due to a gearbox problem and crashing in the second practice session before retiring from the race due to a brake problem. He would then finish fourth in Germany after strategy errors let a recovering Hamilton get past him as he went on to win the race. Verstappen ended the first half of the season with a retirement in Hungary and was narrowly behind his teammate in the championship due to his own recent resurgence and Ricciardo's unreliability.

Verstappen enjoyed a very strong second half of the season, achieving podium finishes in Belgium, Singapore, Japan and the United States, the latter of which he achieved second place having started from 18th on the grid due to a suspension failure in qualifying. Following the qualifying session at the Mexican Grand Prix, Verstappen revealed that a mechanical problem with his Red Bull under braking cost him any chance of becoming the youngest-ever Formula One pole-sitter. As a result, Ricciardo beat Verstappen to pole position by just 0.026 seconds. Verstappen had a better start than Ricciardo and took the lead of the race into the first corner, overtaking the fast-starting Mercedes of Lewis Hamilton. Verstappen earned his fifth career win in Mexico. He was poised to win the 2018 Brazilian Grand Prix, having overtaken Räikkönen, Vettel, Bottas, and Hamilton. However, he collided with Force India driver Esteban Ocon who was trying to unlap himself on faster tyres. Ocon received a 10-second stop-and-go penalty for the incident. After the collision with Ocon, Verstappen finished in second place behind Hamilton. During an argument with Ocon after the race, Verstappen pushed the Force India driver, for which he was given two days of "public service" as a penalty by the FIA. He then finished his season with another podium as he finished third in Abu Dhabi.

Verstappen ended the season in fourth place in the championship with 249 points, claiming two wins, eleven podium finishes, and two fastest laps.

2019 season

In 2019 Red Bull switched from Renault to Honda power units. After Ricciardo moved to the Renault team for 2019, Verstappen was joined at Red Bull by Pierre Gasly. Verstappen qualified in fourth and finished third in Australia, the first podium finish for a Honda-powered driver since the 2008 British Grand Prix. Verstappen was on course for a second third-place finish in Bahrain before a late safety car prevented him from overtaking Charles Leclerc's ailing Ferrari, keeping him in fourth place. Two more fourth-place finishes followed in China and Azerbaijan, and a podium in Spain in third place. In Monaco, Verstappen qualified in third place. He was released into the path of Valtteri Bottas during the drivers' pit stops, gaining second place but receiving a 5-second penalty as a result. Verstappen crossed the line in second place but was demoted to fourth by the penalty.

In Canada, Verstappen's final lap in the second qualifying session was hampered by a red flag brought out by Kevin Magnussen's crash. This caused Verstappen to qualify 11th and start the race in ninth place. He later recovered to finish fifth. In France he started and finished in fourth place. In Austria, Verstappen started third but suffered a poor start, dropping down to eighth. After a charge towards the front, he made his way up to second before controversially passing Leclerc for the lead of the race with three laps to go. This marked the first Honda-powered race victory since the 2006 Hungarian Grand Prix. In Britain, Verstappen, running in third place, was hit from behind during an overtake attempt by Sebastian Vettel and spun into the gravel. Verstappen was able to continue and crossed the line in fifth place.

The wet and chaotic German Grand Prix began similarly to the race in Austria for Verstappen, as a poor start caused him to fall behind. However, he would inherit the lead midway through the race after a crash by race leader Hamilton. Verstappen would go on to extend his lead after the track began to dry, claiming his second victory of the season. In Hungary, he claimed the first pole position of his career and led most of the race before being passed in the closing laps by Hamilton, who had made another stop for fresh tyres in a gamble to catch the leader.

Before the Belgian Grand Prix, Verstappen received a new teammate in Alexander Albon after Pierre Gasly was demoted back to Toro Rosso. In the race, Verstappen had a poor start and collided with Kimi Räikkönen at the first corner, resulting in suspension damage and causing Verstappen's first retirement of the season. In Italy, he did not set a time during qualifying after his car lost power in Q1, but he was already required to start from the back of the grid due to an engine component penalty. After damaging his front wing on the first lap, he recovered to finish the race in eighth place. third and fourth-place finishes followed in Singapore and Russia respectively. After suffering damage in a first-lap collision with Charles Leclerc in Japan, Verstappen suffered his second retirement of the season.

In Mexico, he qualified in first place after setting the fastest lap-time of the session, before being handed a grid penalty for ignoring yellow flags after a crash by Valtteri Bottas. Verstappen suffered a puncture early in the race after making contact with Bottas, falling to the back of the field before eventually recovering to sixth place. A third-place finish in the United States followed, before Verstappen took the second pole position of his career with a 1:07.508 pole lap time in Brazil. In a chaotic race, he passed Lewis Hamilton for the lead on two occasions before going on to claim his third victory of the season. Verstappen ended the season with a second-place finish in Abu Dhabi.

Verstappen finished the 2019 season in third place in the championship with 278 points. He claimed three race victories, nine podium finishes, two pole positions, and three fastest laps.

2020 season

At the 2020 Austrian Grand Prix, he started second, but retired early in the race after a flywheel-related problem caused an electronic issue within the power unit. Honda introduced countermeasures in response to the retirement.

At the 2020 Hungarian Grand Prix, he crashed in wet conditions during the formation lap while he was on his way to the starting grid, but he was able to drive the car back to the grid where his mechanics fixed the suspension of the car in the short time that was left before the start of the race. After the repairs, Verstappen progressed from seventh place on the grid to second place by the end of the race. Verstappen won the 70th Anniversary Grand Prix at Silverstone, having started from fourth.

Verstappen clinched second place at the Spanish Grand Prix, after qualifying in third. At the 2020 Belgian Grand Prix, he scored a podium in third place, following his third place on the starting grid. He suffered from two consecutive DNFs at the Italian and Tuscan Grands Prix after which he lost second place in the Championship. At the Russian Grand Prix, Verstappen finished the race in second, his seventh podium finish of 2020. At the Eifel Grand Prix, Verstappen finished in second after qualifying in third. He also managed to get the fastest lap of the race. At the Portuguese Grand Prix, Verstappen qualified third, however a poor first lap meant that he dropped back down the order to fifth place. He recovered to third and took his 40th podium in Formula 1. At the Emilia Romagna Grand Prix, Verstappen looked set to claim second due to Valtteri Bottas' ailing Mercedes slowing down, but a sudden puncture denied him any chance of a podium finish; Verstappen spun, resulting in his fourth retirement of the 2020 season.

During Free Practice for the Portuguese Grand Prix, Verstappen was criticised for comments he made on the team radio after a collision with Lance Stroll, where he used the words "retard" and "mongol" in response to the clash. Verstappen admitted following the session that the word choices he used were "not correct." The Mongolian government and the Mongol identity asked Verstappen to apologise for the comments; the Mongolian government also urged the FIA to take action on the comments he made.

Verstappen finished the 2020 season in third place in the championship with 214 points. He claimed two race victories, eleven podium finishes, one pole position, and three fastest laps.

2021 season: World Champion

At the Bahrain Grand Prix, Verstappen topped all the practice sessions and subsequently took a career fourth pole position. This was the first time he achieved back-to-back pole positions. He fought Lewis Hamilton for the race victory, and on lap 53 Verstappen overtook Hamilton, but went off track whilst doing so, resulting in him being instructed by race control to let Hamilton back into the lead and ultimately finishing second behind Hamilton. At the next race, the Emilia Romagna Grand Prix, Verstappen qualified third with teammate Sergio Pérez second, marking the first time he was out-qualified by a teammate since the 2019 Italian Grand Prix. At the race start, Verstappen was able to pass both Pérez and pole-sitter Lewis Hamilton to take the lead. He remained in the lead after the first round of pit stops as well as the restart, following the race being suspended on lap 33. Rival Hamilton finished second, reducing his championship lead over Verstappen to one point. In the following Portuguese Grand Prix, Verstappen finished second after a long battle with Lewis Hamilton. At the Spanish Grand Prix, the battle between Verstappen and Hamilton continued, with Hamilton employing a faster two-stop strategy versus Verstappen's one-stop race. This provided Hamilton the advantage of faster tyres, allowing him to overtake Verstappen with several laps remaining in the race. Hamilton took the victory, with Verstappen taking second and the fastest lap, increasing Hamilton's championship lead to 14 points.

At the next race in Monaco, Verstappen qualified second behind Charles Leclerc, but Leclerc suffered a driveshaft failure on the way to the grid and was unable to start the race. Verstappen controlled the race from the front on the way to victory. Hamilton (who qualified seventh) finished seventh, though claiming an extra championship point by setting the fastest race lap. The result enabled Verstappen to take the lead in the Drivers' Championship for the first time in his career, by a margin of four points over Hamilton. At the Azerbaijan Grand Prix, Verstappen qualified third behind Leclerc and Hamilton. Verstappen and Hamilton passed Leclerc in the opening laps before Verstappen took the lead by way of a faster pitstop. Verstappen would comfortably hold the lead until lap 46 when he suffered a tyre failure causing him to crash at high-speed and retire. A mistake by Hamilton on the restart dropped him to last place, meaning Verstappen maintained his championship lead. Verstappen took pole for the French Grand Prix. Verstappen's mistake on the first lap allowed Hamilton to take the lead which Verstappen retook during the pit stop phase. Verstappen pitted for a second time from the lead and set after the Mercedes duo, overtaking Hamilton for the lead on lap 52 of 53. He also took the fastest lap point, extending his championship lead to twelve points. Verstappen clinched pole position again at the Styrian Grand Prix and led the race from start to finish, to give him his fourth win of the season and further extend his lead to 18 points.

Verstappen took pole position at the Austrian Grand Prix, led every lap from start to finish, set the fastest lap, and won the race for his first career grand slam, being the youngest to do so. With the win, Verstappen also became the first driver to win three races in three consecutive weekends, starting at the French Grand Prix on 20 June, then the Styrian Grand Prix on 27 June and ending with the Austrian Grand Prix on 4 July. At the next race; the British Grand Prix, Verstappen was involved in a high-speed collision at the Copse corner with Hamilton on the first lap. This resulted in a 51 g impact with the barrier. He was taken to the Silverstone circuit's medical centre after the crash and was then taken to Coventry hospital for precautionary checks and further assessment, before eventually being discharged at 22:00 local time on Sunday night. Hamilton would go on to win the race, reducing Verstappen's lead in the championship to eight points. At the next race, the Hungarian Grand Prix, Verstappen's car suffered damage in a multi-car collision on lap 1, where Mercedes driver Valtteri Bottas was deemed at fault. He ended the race in tenth which was promoted to ninth after Sebastian Vettel was disqualified. The outcome of the race allowed Hamilton to take the lead of the championship.

Following the summer break, Verstappen qualified on pole at the Belgian Grand Prix, ahead of Williams driver George Russell in second and Lewis Hamilton in third. The race was run for three laps, all behind the safety car, with the race official race results taken from the running order at the end of the first lap, with Hamilton and Verstappen both retaining their qualifying positions. As less than 75% of the race distance was completed, half points were awarded, resulting in Verstappen closing the gap to Hamilton to three points. At the Dutch Grand Prix Verstappen again qualified on pole, beating Hamilton by 0.038 seconds. During the race Verstappen was able to fend off attacks from both Mercedes drivers to take the win, taking the lead in the Drivers' Championship by three points. He made his way back up the field, and after taking an early pit stop for intermediate tyres late in the race, he finished second. At the Turkish Grand Prix, Verstappen qualified second with Bottas on pole. With the race being run in wet conditions and the drivers on intermediate tyres the whole race, Verstappen finished second behind Bottas, taking the lead in the Drivers' Championship by six points as Hamilton finished fifth. 

At the United States Grand Prix, Verstappen took pole position in qualifying, edging Hamilton by 0.209 seconds. Verstappen won the race and extended his lead in the Drivers' Championship to twelve points as Hamilton finished second with the fastest lap. At the 2021 Mexico City Grand Prix, Verstappen qualified third with a gap to pole-sitter Bottas of 0.350 seconds. Verstappen's main opponent Hamilton qualified second. At the race start, Verstappen took the lead from Bottas and Hamilton into turn 1 and won the race, and as a result extended his lead in the championship to 19 points.

Verstappen overtook Hamilton on the final lap to win the race, and his first Formula One World Drivers' Championship. Verstappen, who had qualified on pole position by nearly four-tenths of a second, had a slow start off the line at the start of the race and dropped to second place. Verstappen was trailing Hamilton by over ten seconds until a late safety car was called in due to a crash at turn 14 involving Williams driver Nicholas Latifi. The withdrawal of the safety car and the resumption of the race following the safety car period was met with controversy. Race director Michael Masi allowed only a certain number of lapped cars through, which after the race brought from the Mercedes team a protest and stated intention to appeal against the race result, arguing that all lapped cars should be allowed through, Red Bull counter argued that this was not specified by the wording of the regulations. The protest was rejected, although subsequent investigation by the FIA ruled that Masi had misinterpreted the rule and the wording of the rule was amended for the 2022 season to specify that "all" cars will unlap themselves (at the race director's discretion) rather than "any". Verstappen passed Hamilton at turn 5 of the final lap of the race to become the 34th Formula One World Drivers' Champion.

2022: Dominant second title 
In March 2022 Verstappen signed a five-year contract extension with Red Bull Racing for the 2023 to 2028 seasons.

Verstappen suffered two fuel system related retirements in the first three races, finding himself 46 points behind championship leader Charles Leclerc. He responded by winning five of the next seven races, allowing him to take the championship lead and build a gap of 37 points over second place, by then held by his teammate Sergio Pérez.

He would go on to dominate much of the season, winning 15 races, securing the World Drivers' Championship at the Japanese Grand Prix.

Reception

Qualifying speed

Following Verstappen's maiden pole position at the 2019 Hungarian Grand Prix, former Formula One World Champion Nico Rosberg described him as the fastest driver in Formula One. Rosberg elucidated that Verstappen did not have the fastest car during the qualifying session in Hungary, emphasising that it was Verstappen's raw speed that allowed him to secure pole position: "Mercedes still had the fastest car, and it's just Verstappen with his driving that put it up there in pole."

In 2019, former Formula One World Champion Jenson Button stated that he believes Verstappen is the fastest Formula One driver ever: "I think he is the fastest driver that has ever driven an F1 car. I really do, I think he is unbelievably fast." Journalist Scott Mitchell from The Race commented: "When everything comes together, Verstappen is the quickest driver in F1 over one lap, but the odd mistake and scruffy session must be eliminated." Helmut Marko, head of Red Bull's driver development programme, stated that Verstappen is the fastest driver Red Bull have ever had. In 2021, three-time Formula One World Champion Jackie Stewart claimed that Verstappen is the fastest driver in Formula One, but he also added that Verstappen is still in the "puppy stage" of his career. Peter Windsor, an experienced Formula One journalist, expressed Verstappen's ability to change direction "quicker than anybody else" through the high-speed section Maggots and Becketts: Silverstone's fastest sequence of corners. Windsor stressed that Verstappen's lightning-quick change of direction is a result of the innate feel he has for creating the "perfect platform" to achieve what he wants with the car during a lap. He is intrinsically able to create, for "a trillionth of a second", a minuscule "flat area" between the left and the right of a change of direction ahead of him, in order to attain a stable balance with the car before applying the next steering and throttle input. Scuderia AlphaTauri's team principal, Franz Tost, declared Verstappen to be the fastest driver in Formula One; following the Dutchman's "really deserved" maiden title triumph in 2021. On the subject of sim racing, Verstappen was deemed the "fastest" driver by IndyCar racer and former Formula One driver Romain Grosjean.

Dominance over teammates

Former Formula One driver Eddie Irvine praised Verstappen, stating that he is "by far the most dominant team leader on the grid." Irvine highlighted that Verstappen "has had many different second drivers in the team and none of them have got close to him." During the 2020 season, Jenson Button stated that he doesn't "think there's been a driver that's annihilated their team-mates like he [Verstappen] has in a very long time." Motorsport columnist and former Formula One driver Jolyon Palmer, commented that Verstappen's maiden world championship triumph could usher in a new era of "dominance" in the sport. Palmer wrote:[Verstappen's] qualifying pace is frightening and has been the basis for this title-charging campaign. He's had the most pole positions of anyone with 10 – almost half of the races, and it would have been half had he completed his mesmeric Jeddah lap, which ended up being possibly Max's biggest error in a near-perfect season. For a driver who has demolished three successive team mates in three years and made only a handful of small mistakes in that time, you question what scope their even is for improvement – but if he can take his game onto another level from here, we could be about to see the start of a new era of dominance.Journalist Scott Mitchell expounded the reason why the Dutchman's teammates have fallen short "even with the data." Mitchell wrote: "Verstappen drives mainly on intuition, and that comes from years of training and preparation. He has a database in his head which he can use immediately. Even with data, Gasly and Albon could see where he was faster, but they could never grasp how he was faster there. That's because what makes Verstappen so good is mainly unconscious." According to Mitchell, those years of training and driving on his intuition has made it impossible for other drivers to measure up to Verstappen.

Helmut Marko, the current advisor to the Red Bull GmbH Formula One teams, asserted that Verstappen's progress has moved him clear of his former Formula 1 team-mate Daniel Ricciardo, in both qualifying and race trim. "There is specific data," Marko told Autosport, "In qualifying the gap to Ricciardo is greater. The strange thing is Max sometimes slides more, but still manages to keep the tyres alive." Verstappen previously mentioned that he was three or four-tenths faster on average than "very fast qualifier" Daniel Ricciardo. Marko concluded that then 20-year-old Verstappen "clearly moved away" from Ricciardo since the "second half of the 2018 season."

Natural talent

Following his maiden Formula One win, at the 2016 Spanish Grand Prix, three-time Formula One World Champion Niki Lauda described Verstappen as the "talent of the century." Red Bull Team Principal Christian Horner stated that Verstappen is the best driver Red Bull have ever seen: "I have no doubt [Verstappen is] the best we have seen on one of our cars, in terms of outright raw ability and commitment. He's the best driver we’ve seen."

Former Formula One driver Gerhard Berger echoed Jenson Button's recent comments, anointing Max Verstappen as the Formula One driver of this era with the most raw talent. Speaking to Sport1, Berger ventured: “When it comes to raw talent, Max Verstappen is the most talented of all. But it’s not just about raw talent, it’s about the whole package. That means it’s not just about setting the fastest laps but also to win a race. And not just [about] one race but many and eventually a championship, and championships." Two-time Formula One World Champion Fernando Alonso commented that Verstappen is the standout driver in Formula One, declaring the Red Bull star to be "one step ahead" of everyone. Alonso noted that Verstappen deserved to win the Formula One drivers’ championship in Abu Dhabi, ahead of the title decider that saw the Dutchman and Lewis Hamilton enter level on points: “Mercedes lately have been more performing and they’ve won a couple of races now, but Max is driving – in my opinion – one step ahead of all of us. We saw the [qualifying] lap in Jeddah, until he touched the wall at the last corner, that lap was coming from Max, not the Red Bull." Former Formula One Driver Karun Chandhok likened Verstappen's ruthless and uncompromising attitude in race combat to Michael Schumacher's unyielding and iron-willed style of racing. Verstappen was ranked first in the annual Formula One team principals’ top ten drivers ranking in 2021.

Racecraft
Following Verstappen being given a warning for his driving conduct at the 2016 Belgian Grand Prix, the 18-year-old received the backing of then three-time champion Lewis Hamilton, who commented: "firstly, give the guy a break, he is 18 years old. What the frickin' heck were any of us doing at 18?"

Despite earning high praise and acclaim from Formula One drivers and experts in and out of the sport, Verstappen faced criticism in the wake of the penalties he incurred during the 2021 Saudi Arabian Grand Prix. Following this race, former Formula One driver Martin Brundle wrote: "Such is [his] car control and cunning, he's sometimes able to pull off the audacious moves and leave a margin of doubt as to whether it's hard racing or simply a professional foul outside of the regulations and it's those moments which are generating the confusion, controversies and inconsistencies. Ayrton Senna and Michael Schumacher had their faults too, and I was on the receiving end from both of them on occasions, but it's a sizeable dent on their immense reputations, not a positive." Following an impressive first half of the 2022 season, journalist David Tremayne claimed Verstappen had elevated himself to a new higher level compared to his 2021 title winning season, suggesting Verstappen's first title had made him more relaxed and "chirpy".

Fan support

Verstappen has accumulated a significant fanbase from around the world, but in particular from his home country of the Netherlands. Grand Prix events have dedicated Verstappen grandstands with thousands of travelling Dutch fans, boosting ticket sales particularly for European races such as Belgium, Austria and Hungary. During the 2021 Dutch Grand Prix, Honda's Formula One managing director Masashi Yamamoto praised the Verstappen supporters saying that ″in the six years I've been involved with Honda F1, I've never seen such a great turnout as at the Dutch Grand Prix. It was like being in a football stadium″ and that ″when Max crossed the finish line first, the whole circuit coloured orange″.

In 2021 he was voted the most popular Formula One driver in an official survey.

Verstappen has a supporters song, "Super Max!" which was released by the Pitstop Boys. The song went viral after his 2021 championship victory, reaching number two in the UK and fifth in the Global Spotify viral charts respectively.

Awards and honours 
In 2022, Verstappen was named the winner of the Laureus World Sports Award for Sportsman of the Year.

Karting record

Karting career summary

Racing record

Racing career summary 

 Season still in progress.

Complete FIA European Formula 3 Championship results
(key) (Races in bold indicate pole position) (Races in italics indicate fastest lap)

Complete Macau Grand Prix results

Complete Formula One results
(key) (Races in bold indicate pole position; races in italics indicates fastest lap)

 Did not finish, but was classified as he had completed more than 90% of the race distance.
 Half points awarded as less than 75% of race distance was completed.
 Season still in progress.

Formula One records
Verstappen holds the following Formula One records:

Footnotes

On 3 October 2014, Verstappen became the youngest driver to participate in a Formula One Grand Prix weekend (17 years, 3 days), driving in FP1 at the Japanese Grand Prix, deputising in place of Toro Rosso's Jean-Eric Vergne.

On 3 August 2019, Verstappen became the first Dutch Formula One driver to take pole position, for the Hungarian Grand Prix, while also setting a new lap record on the Hungaroring and becoming the 100th polesitter in the sport's history.

On 23 May 2021, after winning the Monaco Grand Prix, Verstappen became the first Dutch Formula One driver to lead the World Championship.

Notes

References

External links

 
 

 
1997 births
Living people
Sportspeople from Hasselt
Dutch racing drivers
Dutch Formula One drivers
Dutch people of Belgian descent
Belgian people of Dutch descent
Belgian expatriates in Monaco
Belgian racing drivers
Formula One race winners
Formula One World Drivers' Champions
Karting World Championship drivers
FIA Formula 3 European Championship drivers
Toro Rosso Formula One drivers
Red Bull Formula One drivers
Twitch (service) streamers
Van Amersfoort Racing drivers
Motopark Academy drivers
Officers of the Order of Orange-Nassau
Dutch expatriate sportspeople in Monaco